Five Lakes is a group of lakes located in Muromtsevsky District of Omsk Oblast and Kyshtovsky District of Novosibirsk Oblast, Russia.

Lakes
  is a lake in Kyshtovsky District. The nearest settlement: Kurganka of Muromtsevsky District (1 km).
 Lake Lenevo (Lenyovo, Linyovo)
 Lake Schchuchye
 Lake Shaitan
 Lake Urmannoe is located east of Lake Danilino, in Kyshtovsky District. Some media believe that Lake Urmannoe and Lake Shaitan are the same body of water.

References

Five Lakes
Five Lakes